Howard Allen Twitty (born January 15, 1949) is an American professional golfer who played on the PGA Tour in the 1970s, 1980s, and 1990s; and played on the Champions Tour from 1999 until 2007.

Twitty was born in Phoenix, Arizona. He graduated from Arizona State University in Tempe in 1972 and turned pro in 1974. He won three tournaments on the PGA Tour during his career. His best finish in a major tournament was a T-5 at the 1980 PGA Championship. Twitty missed part of the 1996 season due to foot surgery, and now wears sandals with golf spikes while he plays. Twitty played some on the Nationwide Tour in his late forties to prepare for the Champions Tour. After reaching the age of 50 in 1999, he began play on the Champions Tour, where his best finish was a T-2 at the 2000 Toshiba Senior Classic.

Twitty has done some consulting on golf course design. He collaborated with Roger Maltbie on the well-received redesign of the TPC at River Highlands course in Connecticut, site of the Buick Championship. He also collaborated with Tom Weiskopf on the TPC Scottsdale redesign, site of the FBR Open.

Twitty resides in Paradise Valley, a suburb of Scottsdale, Arizona. He has seven children. He lists his special interests as "all sports", and is nicknamed "Twitty-Bird" by his fellow golfers.

Amateur wins (2)
1970 Porter Cup, Sunnehanna Amateur

Professional wins (4)

PGA Tour wins (3)

PGA Tour playoff record (1–0)

Asia Golf Circuit wins (1)
1975 Thailand Open

Results in major championships

CUT = missed the half-way cut
"T" indicates a tie for a place

See also 

 Spring 1975 PGA Tour Qualifying School graduates

References

External links

American male golfers
Arizona State Sun Devils men's golfers
PGA Tour golfers
PGA Tour Champions golfers
Golfers from Phoenix, Arizona
1949 births
Living people